Colonel Maurice Kershaw Matthews OBE, TD, DL (21 June 1880 – 20 June 1957) was a British army officer, businessman, and local politician.  He was also a sport shooter, who competed in the 1908 Summer Olympics.

In the 1908 Olympics he won a gold medal in the team small-bore rifle event, silver in the moving target small-bore rifle event, was fourth in the stationary target small-bore rifle event and 9th in the disappearing target small-bore rifle event.

Matthews went into business as a valuer, rating assessor and estate agent, based in Tottenham Court Road.

He held a commission as an officer in the Territorial Force and later Territorial Army, reaching the rank of lieutenant-colonel in the 1st City of London Regiment. He was awarded the Territorial Decoration in 1930. He was subsequently granted the brevet rank of colonel in the Royal Fusiliers, retiring in 1940.

From 1931-36 he sat on the London County Council, representing St Pancras South West as a member of the Conservative-backed Municipal Reform Party.

In 1935 he was appointed a Deputy Lieutenant of the County of London.

Matthews was sometime chairman and vice-president of the London Trustees Savings Bank, and in 1955 became vice-president of the Trustees Savings Banks Association. He was awarded the OBE in the 1953 New Year's Honours.

He died in Bournemouth in 1957, aged 77.

References

External links
profile

1880 births
1957 deaths
British Army personnel of World War I
British Army personnel of World War II
Military personnel from London
British male sport shooters
ISSF rifle shooters
Olympic shooters of Great Britain
Shooters at the 1908 Summer Olympics
Olympic gold medallists for Great Britain
Olympic silver medallists for Great Britain
Olympic medalists in shooting
London Regiment officers
Members of London County Council
Deputy Lieutenants of the County of London
Royal Fusiliers officers
Medalists at the 1908 Summer Olympics